Miryam Bouchard is a Canadian film director and screenwriter from Quebec, whose debut feature film My Very Own Circus (Mon cirque à moi) was released in 2020.

The daughter of a circus performer, she directed a number of short films and television episodes before releasing My Very Own Circus in 2020. In 2019, she won a Gémeaux Award for Best Direction in a Comedy Series for her work on M'entends-tu?

In 2022 she was co-director with Catherine Chabot of Lines of Escape (Lignes de fuite), and directed the romantic comedy film Two Days Before Christmas (23 décembre).

References

External links

21st-century Canadian screenwriters
21st-century Canadian women writers
Canadian women screenwriters
Canadian women film directors
Canadian television directors
Canadian women television directors
Canadian screenwriters in French
French Quebecers
Film directors from Quebec
Living people
Screenwriters from Quebec